Willi Gutmann was a notable Swiss sculptor. Gutmann was born in 1927 in the town of Dielsdorf, Switzerland, near Zurich. He died on February 21, 2013. He began his career as an architect and designer but moved on to sculpture in the early 1960s. The majority of his sculptures employ metals and alloys that he transformed in various ways. Gutmann specialized in monumental sculptures based on disjointed, movable bodies. Gutmann's sculptures can be found throughout the world, including the United States, Mexico, Canada, Japan, and across Europe. 

Gutmann's largest sculpture, "Two Columns with Wedge" (1971), is 84 feet tall and is located at the Embarcadero Center in San Francisco, California. 

He was the artist representing Switzerland at the 1968 Summer Olympics Route of Friendship in Mexico City. His work, "Twin Circles Geared Together" is located in Mervis Hall at the University of Pittsburgh.

External links
 www.willigutmann.ch
 www.galerieartint.com/rep/gutmann.asp
 info.lib.uh.edu/sca/digital/time/people_large.html?ID=14
 www.umc.pitt.edu:591/u/FMPro?-db=ustory&-lay=a&-format=d.html&storyid=4242&-Find

References 

1927 births
2013 deaths
Swiss sculptors